Aratos is a settlement in the Arriana municipality, Rhodope regional unit, Eastern Macedonia and Thrace region, Greece.

See also
 List of settlements in the Rhodope regional unit

References

Populated places in Rhodope (regional unit)